The athletics events at the 2003 Afro-Asian Games were held from 28–30 October 2003, at the GMC Balayogi Athletic Stadium. A total of 42 events were contested at the inaugural edition of the Games.

Medal summary

Men

Women

Medal table

References

Day reports
Afro-Asian Games - Preview. IAAF (2003-10-27). Retrieved on 2009-07-16.
Weerawansa, Dinesh (2003-10-28). Gold honours shared - Afro-Asian Games Athletics, Day One. IAAF. Retrieved on 2009-07-16.
Weerawansa, Dinesh (2003-10-29). Fredericks flies to 200m title - Afro-Asian Games, Day Two. IAAF. Retrieved on 2009-07-16.
Weerawansa, Dinesh (2003-10-30). Ethiopian distance runners and Nigerian sprinters dominate – Afro-Asian Games – Last day.. IAAF. Retrieved on 2009-07-16.

Results
Results 28 October. AfroAsianGames.org (web.archive). Retrieved on 2009-07-16.
Results 29 October. AfroAsianGames.org (web.archive). Retrieved on 2009-07-16.
Results 30 October. AfroAsianGames.org (web.archive). Retrieved on 2009-07-16.
AfricAthle
Tunisathle

Specific

External links
Official website (at web.archive.org)

2003 Afro-Asian Games
2003
Afro-Asian Games
Athletics
2003 Afro-Asian Games
Afro-Asian Games